The Tarbell Building is a historic commercial building located in the Village of Marathon in Cortland County, New York. It is a three-story brick structure constructed in 1885 in the Queen Anne style. It has retail storefronts on the first floor and apartments and storage on the second and third. A rock-faced foundation pierced with basement windows is exposed on the south side. The Tarbell Building was listed on the National Register of Historic Places in 2000.

It was built by Gage E. Tarbell (1856-1936), who rose from poor boy to become, over time, a jeweler, lawyer, mining promoter and insurance broker. He served as vice president of the Equitable Assurance Company. Tarbell again commissioned fine architecture at Garden City, a model suburb he later helped develop on Long Island.

References

External links

Commercial buildings on the National Register of Historic Places in New York (state)
Queen Anne architecture in New York (state)
Commercial buildings completed in 1885
Residential buildings on the National Register of Historic Places in New York (state)
Buildings and structures in Cortland County, New York
Victorian architecture in New York (state)
National Register of Historic Places in Cortland County, New York